Onésime Gauthier (December 2, 1834 – June 16, 1886) was a farmer and political figure in Quebec. He represented Charlevoix as a Conservative member from 1875 to 1886.

He was born in Saint-Urbain, Charlevoix County, Lower Canada, the son of Michel Gauthier-Larouche and Marie Tremblay, and was educated there. In 1871, he married Mélanie Simard. Gauthier was also an educator, a colonization director and agent for the Canadian Titanic Iron Company Ltd. He served as mayor of Saint-Urbain for several years. Gauthier died in office at Quebec City at the age of 51.

References
 

1834 births
1886 deaths
Conservative Party of Quebec MNAs
Mayors of places in Quebec